Lee Eastman (born Leopold Vail Epstein; January 12, 1910 – July 30, 1991) was an American show business lawyer and art collector from New York City. He was the son of Louis and Stella (Freyer) Epstein, who immigrated to the United States from Russia in 1906.

One of his four children was Linda McCartney, the first wife of former Beatle Paul McCartney. Eastman became McCartney's business manager shortly before the breakup of The Beatles, while his son John Eastman represented McCartney during his 1970 lawsuit to dissolve the group legally. He is the maternal grandfather of potter Heather McCartney, photographer Mary McCartney, fashion designer Stella McCartney, and musician/sculptor James McCartney. Eastman was also the friend and longtime lawyer for and collector of the works of the abstract expressionist painter Willem de Kooning. His sister Rose Frisch became a noted scientist who worked on issues of women's fertility and population studies. His family was Jewish.

Involvement with Apple Corps 
When the Beatles' company Apple Corps was in business trouble early in 1969, Eastman and Allen Klein were both considered to take the reins of the company, and of the band's careers. John Lennon favoured Klein. Lennon said he was impressed that Klein knew Lennon's lyrics, and understood them and that Klein was very intelligent. George Harrison and Ringo Starr chose Klein, though Lennon said in 1970 that he maneuvered Klein into Apple Corps. McCartney wanted Eastman, but was out-voted 3–1. For a short period, Klein managed Apple Corps and the personal careers of Lennon, Harrison, and Starr while Eastman was the corporate counsel and managed McCartney. The Klein/Eastman combination did not work, and after a contentious meeting, Eastman was out. Subsequent disagreements over decisions made by Klein and the other Beatles prompted McCartney— represented by Eastman— to sue them to dissolve the partnership, and he eventually succeeded.

Klein made some successful deals for the Beatles, and they made more money during their short tenure with Klein than they had during the years they were managed by Brian Epstein. Lennon, Harrison, and Starr eventually soured on Klein, and after a series of suits and countersuits, Klein left Apple Corps with a multimillion-dollar buyout.

Manager of McCartney 
Eastman and his son successfully managed McCartney's solo career, leaving McCartney the wealthiest of the former Beatles. In 1984, McCartney cited one example of advice he received from Eastman:

McCartney's music publishing investments have paid off. In 1984, he estimated that half his income came from recording, and half from his music publishing business.

Personal life 
Eastman had four children with his first wife Louise Lindner, herself the daughter of a prominent Cleveland department store executive. Lindner died in a plane crash in 1962. He later remarried Monique de T. Schless. Eastman died of a stroke on July 30, 1991 in a New York City hospital; he was 81. His son John Eastman died on August 10, 2022 of pancreatic cancer, at the age of 83.

References

External links 
Danny Fields' biography

Apple Corps
1910 births
1991 deaths
20th-century American lawyers
McCartney family
American music managers
American people of Russian-Jewish descent
20th-century American musicians